Allendale Columbia School (often shortened to Allendale Columbia or abbreviated as A.C.) is an independent, nonsectarian, college preparatory school for students in nursery through twelfth grade in Rochester, New York, USA. The Columbia School for girls, established in 1890 by Caroline Milliman and Alida Lattimore, and the Allendale School for boys, established in 1926 by a group of Rochester businessmen, merged in 1972 to form the current co-educational school. Allendale Columbia students come from 28 different school districts in the greater Rochester, New York region, as well as from 10 different countries. International students live in two houses on campus. The school was named by Worth magazine as of one of the top 100 feeder schools to Ivy League universities. It was also ranked as the best private high school in Monroe County by Niche and The Post-Standard. Newsweek named Allendale Columbia as one of the best STEM schools in America.

Mission Statement 
At Allendale Columbia, we prepare students for the world they will inherit. In our trusting and responsive environment, students in nursery through grade 12 grow in confidence and develop scholastic independence. Together, our students and teachers imagine, design, and create in order to make a positive impact locally and globally.

Faculty
Allendale Columbia has sixty-nine teachers. Of the twenty-five Upper School faculty members, 96% hold advanced degrees.

Campus
The school is separated into three divisions: Lower School, Middle School and Upper School. The school also offers pre-primary school for children 18 months to three years old. While these divisions each have their own areas on campus, they share many common spaces, including a 500-seat performance center, library, dining commons for locally sourced lunches, and athletic, music and arts facilities. The students change buildings for various classes and use the entire campus throughout their day.

The main buildings house 41 classrooms, five science laboratories, nine computer laboratories (three classroom and six mobile), three music classrooms, two art studios, a darkroom, a digital photography laboratory, a foreign language laboratory, a library, a performance center, two gymnasia, and a science wing.

In 2012, the school opened residences for foreign students, and it hosts 25-35 international students from as many as 15 different countries and four continents.

In 2013, students began organizing and hosting an annual TEDx conference on campus, as an independently organized TED event.

In 2014, Allendale Columbia School created a summerLEAP partnership with School 17 of the Rochester City School District to provide summer enrichment programs for RCSD students.

In 2015, the school unveiled a new design and innovation laboratory with 3D printers, Mac computers, drafting tables, and tools.  That year, the school also partnered with the Hybrid Learning Consortium. It creates a globalized learning community offering a diverse variety of online courses to students around the world.

In 2016, the school celebrated its 125th anniversary.

Athletics
Allendale Columbia School is merged with The Harley School for interscholastic sports competition in grades 7 through 12. The two schools began coordinating their athletic programs during the 1972–1973 school year. The joint program is referred to as Harley Allendale Columbia (HAC) and originally competed as the Harley-Allendale Columbia Braves. In 1997, students of both schools voted to change the team name from the Braves to the Wolves. Team supporters are known as the Wolfpack.

The HAC enforces a "no-cut" athletic program, and varsity places are guaranteed for any committed seniors. The HAC co-ordination exists to enhance the interscholastic athletic program of both schools by combining student bodies and resources, as well as faculty for coaching purposes. The school has had success in the Section V Finger-Lakes West Division, including sectional titles in boys' and girls' tennis, boys' and girls' soccer, boys' and girls' cross country and boys' and girls' basketball.

 V = Varsity, JV = Junior Varsity, M = Modified

Notable alumni
 Alison Castle, photographer and author
Carson Cooman, Composer-in-Residence at Harvard University
Richard C. David, politician and Mayor of Binghamton, New York
 Taye Diggs (later transferred to School of the Arts (Rochester, New York), actor
 Nancy Northup, President of the Center for Reproductive Rights
 Katelin Schutz, physicist and cosmologist
 Kristen Wiig, actress and comedian, student, 1987-89

References

External links
Official website

Private high schools in New York (state)
Preparatory schools in New York (state)
Schools in Monroe County, New York
Private middle schools in New York (state)
Private elementary schools in New York (state)